Meeli Truu (27 April 1946 — 7 August 2013) was an Estonian architect. 

She designed the Swissôtel Tallinn and the Rocca al Mare Shopping Centre.

Gallery

References 

Estonian women architects
1946 births
2013 deaths
Architects from Tallinn
Estonian Academy of Arts alumni